Troy Verges is an American songwriter of country and pop music from Louisiana.

Career
His first cut as a songwriter was a track on Faith Hill's Breathe. 
His credits include the singles "Wanted", recorded by Hunter Hayes; "Beer Money", recorded by Kip Moore; "Who I Am", recorded by Jessica Andrews; "Blessed", recorded by Martina McBride; "Wasted", recorded by Carrie Underwood; "Day Drinking", recorded by Little Big Town; "Shotgun Rider", recorded by Tim McGraw; and "I Want Crazy", recorded by Hunter Hayes all of which went to number one on the country music charts.

"Wanted" was ACM nominated in 2013 for Song of the Year, while "I Want Crazy" received a 2014 Grammy nomination and "Day Drinking" received a 2015 Grammy nomination. "Wanted", composed by Hunter Hayes and Troy Verges, took home Song Of The Year honors at the 2013 BMI Country Awards. and was also named one of Billboard's top ten songs of the decade 

He produced and mixed the Anders Osborne album Coming Down.

Awards
Verges was named "Songwriter of the Year" in 2002 by Broadcast Music Incorporated and "Songwriter of the Year" by the Nashville Songwriters Association International.

In 2011, Verges garnered both and Oscar nomination and a Golden Globe nomination in the Best Original Song category for his composition "Coming Home" from the film Country Strong.

List of songs co-written by Verges
(alphabetical by song title)

Taylor Swift – "A Perfectly Good Heart"
Sara Evans – "Backseat of a Greyhound Bus"
Kip Moore – "Beer Money"
Kip Moore – "Bittersweet Company" 
Martina McBride – "Blessed"
 Kolby Cooper - "Breaking News" 
Marié Digby – "Breathing Underwater"
Matt Nathanson – "Bulletproof Weeks"
Trisha Yearwood – "Can't Take Back Goodbye" 
Chaley Rose (from The Music Of Nashville soundtrack) – "Carry You Home"
Pia Toscano, Alexandra Kay, Taz Zavala  (from the Westside soundtrack) – "Champagne High" 
Tim McGraw - "Christmas All Over The World" 
Carly Pearce – "Closer to You" 
Marié Digby – "Come Find Me"
Kip Moore – "Come Home with You" 
Gwyneth Paltrow – "Coming Home"
Carrie Underwood – "Crazy Dreams"
Rascal Flatts – "Dance" 
Little Big Town – "Day Drinking"
Kellie Pickler – "Didn't You Know How Much I Loved You"
Jason Aldean – "Don't Give Up on Me"
Trisha Yearwood – "Drink Up" 
Tim McGraw – "Drugs or Jesus"
Cassadee Pope – "Everybody Sings"
Caylee Hammack – "Family Tree" 
Kelleigh Bannen – "Famous"
Kip Moore – "Fast Women" 
David Nail -"Fighter" 
Hunter Hayes – "Flashlight"
Carolyn Dawn Johnson – "Georgia"
Drake White – "Girl in Pieces" 
Maggie Rose – "Girl in Your Truck Song"
Kip Moore – "Girl of the Summer"
Craig Morgan – "God Must Really Love Me"
David Nail – "Good at Tonight" 
Kip Moore – "Good Thing" 
Gordie Sampson – "Hanging by a Wire"
Emerson Hart – "Hallway"
Jessica Andrews – "Helplessly, Hopelessly"
Kellie Pickler – "Happy"
Backstreet Boys – "Helpless When She Smiles"
Laura Bell Bundy – "I Am What I Am"
Caitlyn Smith - "I Don't Like The World Without You" 
Caitlyn Smith – "I Don't Wanna Love You Anymore" 
Hunter Hayes – "I Want Crazy"
Trisha Yearwood – "I Would've Loved You Anyway"
LeAnn Rimes – "I Wish I Was Wrong"
Trisha Yearwood – "I'll Carry You Home" 
Kellie Pickler – "I'm Your Woman"
Brantley Gilbert – "If You Want a Bad Boy"
Dia Frampton – "Isabella"
Nitty Gritty Dirt Band – "It's Good to Be Alive"
Rhonda Vincent – "I've Forgotten You"
Steven Lee Olsen – "Just Married" 
Caylee Hammack – "King Size Bed" 
Caitlyn Smith - "Lately" 
Carrie Underwood – "Leave Love Alone"
Joe Nichols – "Let's Get Drunk and Fight"
Emerson Drive – "Lemonade"
Brie Larson – "Life After You"
Billy Ray Cyrus – "Like Nothing Else" 
Danielle Bradbery - "Look At The Mess I'm In" 
Marco Borsato & Sita – "Lopen Op Het Water"
Faith Hill – "Love Is a Sweet Thing"
Shelby Darrall - "Love Me When I'm Leavin" 
Darius Rucker – "Low Country"
Jessica Simpson – "Man Enough"
Caitlyn Smith – "Midnight In New York City" 
Jessica Simpson – "Might as Well Be Making Love"
Celine Dion – "Naked"
Sara Evans – "Niagra"
Backstreet Boys – "No Place"
Tori Kelly - "North Star" 
Hunter Hayes – "Nothing Like Starting Over"
BoA – "Obsessed"
Cassadee Pope – "One Song Away"
Sara Evans – "Otis Redding"
Faith Hill – "Paris"
Kelly Sweet – "Raincoat"
Josh Dorr – "Rocket"
Kip Moore – "Running for You"
Katharine McPhee – "Say Goodbye"
Tim McGraw – "Shotgun Rider"
Carolyn Dawn Johnson – "Simple Life"
Tim McGraw — "Sleep Tonight"
Brothers Osborne – "Slow Your Roll" 
Steven Tyler – "Somebody New" 
Hunter Hayes – "Someday Girl" 
Easton Corbin – "Someday When I'm Old"
Matraca Berg – "South of Heaven"
Maura O'Connell – "Spinning Wheel"
Caitlyn Smith – "St. Paul" 
Backbone (Meat Loaf, John Rich, Lil Jon, Mark McGrath) – "Stand in the Storm"
Hunter Hayes – "Still"
Hunter Hayes – "Storyline"
Faith Hill – "Stronger"
Gordie Sampson – "Sunburn"
Hunter Hayes – "Tattoo"
Tim McGraw, Josh Gracin – "Telluride"
Trisha Yearwood – "Tell Me Something I Don't Know" 
Lori McKenna – "The Bird & The Rifle" – 
Danielle Bradbery – "The Heart of Dixie"
Il Divo – "The Man You Love"
Paulina Rubio – "The One You Love (Todo Mi Amor)"
Lindsay Lohan – "The Very Last Moment in Time"
Trace Adkins - "The Way I Wanna Go" 
Steven Lee Olsen – "There I Said It" 
Maura O'Connell – "There's No Good Day for Dying"
Jon McLaughlin – "Things That You Say"
Tara Oram – "Things I Should've Said"
Steve Moakler – "Thirty" 
 Annelise Cepero - "This Is Christmas" (from the "Holiday Harmony" soundtrack)
Terri Clark – "Three Mississippi"
Steven Lee Olsen – "Timing Is Everything" 
Andy Griggs – "Tonight I Wanna Be Your Man"
Edens Edge – "Too Good to Be True"
Steven Lee Olsen – "Undefeated" 
Martina McBride – "You're Not Leaving Me"
Hunter Hayes – "Wanted"
Carrie Underwood – "Wasted"
Bon Jovi – "We Can Dance"
 Kat Higgins – "We Go Driving" 
Trisha Yearwood – "What Gave Me Away" 
Montgomery Gentry – "What It Takes" 
Kip Moore – "What Ya Got On Tonight"
Tim McGraw – "What You're Looking For" 
Jessica Andrews – "Who I Am"
Hunter Hayes – "Wild Blue"
Danielle Bradbery – "Wild Boy"
Lonestar – "With Me"
Keith Urban —"You or Somebody Like You"
Kenny Chesney – "You Save Me"
High Valley – "Your Mama" 
Jason Aldean - "Your Mama"

See also

 List of people from Louisiana
 List of songwriters

References

External links
Troy Verges at BMI
Troy Verges at Universal Music Publishing Group
Troy Verges discography at Discogs.com

Year of birth missing (living people)
Place of birth missing (living people)
20th-century births
20th-century American writers
20th-century American composers
21st-century American writers
21st-century American composers
American country songwriters
American male songwriters
American pop musicians
Living people
Songwriters from Louisiana
20th-century American male writers
20th-century American male musicians
21st-century American male musicians